Craigentinny/Duddingston is one of the seventeen wards used to elect members of the City of Edinburgh Council. Established in 2007 along with the other wards, it currently elects four Councillors.

The ward's territory lies to the east of the city centre, with the Firth of Forth providing its eastern boundary and Holyrood Park occupying most of its western half. As its name suggests, it covers the communities of Craigentinny and Duddingston, as well as Jock's Lodge, Lochend, Meadowbank, Meadowfield, Mountcastle, Northfield, Piershill, Restalrig and Willowbrae. Originally returning three members, a minor boundary change in 2017 saw the loss of Abbeyhill, Dumbiedykes and Durham neighbourhoods to three other adjoining wards; however the population increased slightly due to the addition of streets south of Restalrig Railway Path (including two tower blocks) and housebuilding in other areas, and due to this an additional councillor was allocated. In 2019, the ward had a population of 29,927.

Councillors

Election Results

2022 Election
2022 City of Edinburgh Council election

2017 Election
2017 City of Edinburgh Council election

2020 by-election
On 21 February 2020, SNP councillor Ian Campbell stood down due to health reasons. A by-election was held on 12 November 2020 and was won by the SNP's Ethan Young.

2012 Election
2012 City of Edinburgh Council election

                            

Labour councillor Alex Dunn defected from the Labour Party and joined the SNP on 4 December 2013.

2007 Election
2007 City of Edinburgh Council election

Notes

References

External links
Listed Buildings in Craigentinny/Duddingston Ward, City of Edinburgh at British Listed Buildings

Wards of Edinburgh